The Nottinghamshire Women's cricket team is the women's representative cricket team for the English historic county of Nottinghamshire. They play their home games at John Fretwell Sporting Complex, Nettleworth and are captained by Teresa Graves.  In 2019, they played in Division One of the final season of the Women's County Championship, and in 2021 won the East Midlands Group of the Women's Twenty20 Cup. They are partnered with the East Midlands regional side Lightning.

History

1934–1999: Early History
Nottinghamshire Women's first recorded match took place in 1934, which they lost to the Women's Cricket Association. They went on to play various one-off games against nearby teams, such as Warwickshire and Lincolnshire. East Midlands Women, which included players from Nottinghamshire, joined the Women's Area Championship in 1980, and was a founding member of the Women's County Championship. East Midlands won Division One of the Championship in 1999.

2000– : Women's County Championship
Nottinghamshire replaced East Midlands in Division One of the County Championship for the 2000 season, finishing second with four out of five wins. Nottinghamshire remained in Division One for a further four seasons, finishing second again in 2003, but were relegated in 2004. After two seasons in Division 2, Nottinghamshire returned to Division One and remained a consistently mid-table side.

In 2009, Nottinghamshire played in the 2009 RSA T20 Cup, a tri-series in Ireland with Pakistan and Ireland. They finished bottom of the table, but managed one win against Ireland. In 2010, they joined the Women's Twenty20 Cup, placing 2nd in their regional division in their first season. They reached the semi-finals in 2013, but lost to eventual winners Kent. In 2014, however, Nottinghamshire were crowned the Champions of the tournament, first qualifying for Round 2 unbeaten, then finishing above Middlesex and Kent in the final group on Net Run Rate.

Since then, Nottinghamshire have had a brief stint in Division Two in both competitions, in 2016 in the Championship and 2017 in the T20 Cup. In both instances, they gained promotion at their first attempt. In 2019, they finished 6th in the Championship and 9th in the T20 Cup. In 2021, they competed in the East Midlands Group of the Twenty20 Cup, and won their region, going unbeaten with 5 wins and 3 matches abandoned due to rain. In 2022, they finished fourth in Group 1 of the Twenty20 Cup.

Players

Current squad
Based on appearances in the 2022 season.

Notable players
Players who have played for Nottinghamshire and played internationally are listed below, in order of first international appearance (given in brackets):

 Betty Belton (1937)
 Mona Greenwood (1937)
 Annie Geeves (1951)
 Karen Smithies (1986)
 Wendy Watson (1987)
 Jane Smit (1992)
 Ella Donnison (1999)
 Dawn Holden (1999)
 Kate Lowe (1999)
 Nicky Shaw (1999)
 Yulandi van der Merwe (2000)
 Jenny Gunn (2004)
 Leah Poulton (2006)
 Rene Farrell (2007)
 Lucy Doolan (2008)
 Danni Wyatt (2010)
 Maddy Green (2012)
 Megan Schutt (2012)
 Jodie Cook (2014)
 Sonia Odedra (2014)
 Sarah Bryce (2018)
 Rachel Hawkins (2018)
 Kirstie Gordon (2018)
 Jasmine Titmuss (2019)

Seasons

Women's County Championship

Women's Twenty20 Cup

Honours
 County Championship:
 Division Two champions (1) – 2006
 Women's Twenty20 Cup:
 Champions (1) – 2014
 Division Two champions (1) – 2017
 Group winners (1) – 2021

See also
 Nottinghamshire County Cricket Club
 Lightning (women's cricket)

References

Cricket in Nottinghamshire
Women's cricket teams in England